Nikoloz Basilashvili defeated Roberto Bautista Agut in the final, 7–6(7–5), 6–2 to win the men's singles tennis title at the 2021 Qatar Open. Basilashvili saved a match point against Roger Federer in the quarterfinals.

Andrey Rublev was the defending champion, but lost in the semifinals to Bautista Agut.

This tournament marked the return of former world No. 1 Federer to the tour for the first time since the 2020 Australian Open, due to a pair of knee surgeries since then.

Seeds
The top four seeds received a bye into the second round.

Draw

Finals

Top half

Bottom half

Qualifying

Seeds

Qualifiers

Lucky loser

Qualifying draw

First qualifier

Second qualifier

Third qualifier

Fourth qualifier

References

External links
Main draw
Qualifying draw

Singles